Brian Christopher Rose (born October 19, 1979) is a former American stock car racing driver.

Racing career
Rose began his NASCAR career in 2001 in the NASCAR Craftsman Truck Series.  He ran 15 races for Rick Ware in the No. 51, scoring a best finish of 12th.

In 2002, Rose went in a new direction, joining Bobby Hamilton Racing. Driving the No. 4, he scored a career best finish of 3rd in the season opener at Daytona International Speedway.  However Rose was released later in the season.  He raced for Billy Ballew Motorsports and Rick Ware Racing to finish off the season.  He finished the season racing 21 races, with 1 top five, 5 top tens, finishing 22nd in points.

In 2003 he raced in two races before being suspended by NASCAR for failing to take a drug test; this followed an arrest that included charges for possession of marijuana and a handgun.

In 2010, NASCAR lifted the indefinite suspension, and Rose tried to make his first race at Nashville Superspeedway, but failed to qualify. However, the following race, he made the race at Kansas Speedway, but was caught up in a crash to end his day; he has not competed in NASCAR since 2010.

Legal troubles
On June 27, 2014, Rose was indicted on charges of running a Ponzi scheme involving an allegedly fraudulent coal mining operation starting in 2011. In 2016, Rose was sentenced to prison for 9 years.

Motorsports career results

NASCAR
(key) (Bold – Pole position awarded by qualifying time. Italics – Pole position earned by points standings or practice time. * – Most laps led.)

Winston Cup Series

References

External links
 

Living people
1979 births
Sportspeople from Bowling Green, Kentucky
Racing drivers from Kentucky
NASCAR drivers